Norman Barrett  is a veteran British circus ringmaster who made many appearances on television, notably with Charlie Cairoli in the children's television series Right Charlie.

He is well-known for his act with performing budgerigars. As a younger man, he was a bareback rider, famous for his Ben-Hur act where he would stand astride two horses while others ran in the opposite direction between his legs.

He was awarded the MBE in the 2010 New Year honours list.

Barrett worked with all the world's great circuses and spent 25 years at Blackpool Tower Circus. He was also the ringmaster of the Belle Vue Christmas Circus in Manchester in the 1970s and early 1980s.

Barrett was the subject of This Is Your Life in 1990 when he was surprised by Michael Aspel at the Tower Circus in Blackpool.

Barrett has spent the last 16 years as ringmaster for the well-known Zippo's Circus touring England and Scotland.

In 2013, Barrett appeared as the Mystery Guest on Russell Howard's Good News, series 8 episode 6.

Barrett, with his budgies, appeared as a guest on Sunday Night at the Palladium in May 2015.

External links 
Circopedia Biography
BBC article

References

Living people
Members of the Order of the British Empire
Ringmasters
Year of birth missing (living people)